Catotrichinae is a subfamily of Cecidomyiidae. Members of this subfamily were formerly included in Lestremiinae and are considered the most primitive members Cecidomyiidae. The larvae feed on fungi. Five genera are currently recognized.

Genera

 Catotricha Edwards, 1938
 †Mesotrichoca Jaschhof & Jaschhof, 2008
 Trichoceromyia Jaschhof & Fitzgerald, 2016
 Trichotoca Jaschhof & Jaschhof, 2008
 Wheeleriola Jaschhof & Jaschhof, 2020

References

 
Nematocera subfamilies